Japalura major (large mountain lizard or greater forest agama) is an agamid lizard found in northern India and Nepal.

References

Further reading
 Jamdar, N. 1985. A note on the habits and breeding of the lizard Japalura major. J. Bombay Nat. Hist. Soc. 82: 420-421
 Jerdon, T. C. 1870. Notes on Indian herpetology. P. Asiatic Soc. Bengal March 1870: 66–85.
 Smith, M. A. 1935. Reptiles and Amphibia, Vol. II. In: The Fauna of British India, Including Ceylon and Burma. Taylor and Francis, London, 440 pp.

Japalura
Reptiles of India
Reptiles of Nepal
Taxa named by Thomas C. Jerdon
Reptiles described in 1870